Slovenia competed at the 2020 Summer Olympics in Tokyo. Originally scheduled to take place from 24 July to 9 August 2020, the Games were postponed to 23 July to 8 August 2021, because of the COVID-19 pandemic. This was the nation's eighth consecutive appearance at the Summer Olympics as an independent nation. Slovenian athletes won five medals, including three gold, won by canoeist Benjamin Savšek, road racing cyclist Primož Roglič, and sport climber Janja Garnbret. Three gold medals is an all-time record for Slovenia at the Summer Olympics, having previously won two gold in 2000. The Olympics saw the debut of the men's basketball team who finished fourth in the tournament.

Medalists

Summary
In June 2021, the Olympic Committee of Slovenia officially confirmed 41 competitors who would represent the country at the Tokyo Summer Olympics. On 4 July 2021, the national men's basketball team won the Olympic Qualifying Tournaments in Kaunas, secured a spot at the Olympic tournament, and bringing the total number of athletes to 53. Eva Terčelj, a canoeist, and Bojan Tokić, a table tennis player, were chosen as the flag bearers at the opening ceremony. This was the first time in Olympic history that there were two flag bearers, a man and a woman. Slovenia sent competitors in 14 sports. Apart from the men's basketball team, the sports with five or more competitors were athletics, cycling, canoeing, and judo. Miroslav Cerar, a gymnast who won gold at the 1964 Summer Olympics in Tokyo, was chosen as the leader of the Slovenian Olympic Team.   

At the 2016 Summer Olympics, Slovenian athletes won four medals, including one gold. Vasilij Žbogar, a sailor, has since retired from competing. Judokas Tina Trstenjak and Anamari Velenšek returned to the Olympic tournament, as did the canoeist Peter Kauzer. Other potential candidates included cyclists Tadej Pogačar, the incumbent Tour de France winner, and Primož Roglič, the sport climbing champion Janja Garnbret, canoeists Terčelj and Benjamin Savšek, and the discus thrower Kristjan Čeh. The basketball team, the reigning European champions led by the NBA star Luka Dončić, was seen as a team that could reach high.

The first medal event for Slovenia took place on 24 July, the men's road race in cycling. Following an early breakaway, Jan Tratnik led the chase for a long time. In the finish kilometres, Richard Carapaz and Brandon McNulty broke away from the peloton that has by then thinned out. Carapaz won the race while the chase group set themselves up for the sprint for the silver and bronze medals, resulting in an 8-way race for the finish in the final metres of the race. Pogačar won bronze, slightly behind Wout van Aert. Roglič finished 28th with over 6 minutes behind, having still not completely recovered from his fall at Tour de France.

Competitors
The following is the list of number of competitors in the Games.

Archery

One Slovenian archer booked a place in the men’s individual recurve by finishing in the top four at the Europe Continental Qualification Tournament in Antalya, Turkey.

Athletics

Slovenian athletes further achieved the entry standards, either by qualifying time or by world ranking, in the following track and field events (up to a maximum of 3 athletes in each event):

Track & road events

Field events

Basketball

Indoor
Summary

Men's tournament 

Slovenia men's basketball team qualified for the Olympics by securing its lone outright berth and winning the final match over the host Lithuania at the Kaunas leg of the 2020 FIBA Olympic Qualifying Tournament, marking the nation's debut in the sport since the breakup of the SFR Yugoslavia.

Team roster

Group play

Quarterfinal

Semifinal

Bronze medal game

Canoeing

Slalom
Slovenian canoeists qualified one boat for each of the following classes through the 2019 ICF Canoe Slalom World Championships in La Seu d'Urgell, Spain.

Sprint
Slovenia qualified a single boat in the women's K-2 200 m for the Games by finishing fourth overall and second among those nations eligible for Olympic qualification at the 2019 ICF Canoe Sprint World Championships in Szeged, Hungary.

Qualification Legend: FA = Qualify to final (medal); FB = Qualify to final B (non-medal)

Cycling

Road
Slovenia entered a squad of five riders (four men and one woman) to compete in their respective Olympic road races, by virtue of their top 50 national finish (for men) and top 22 (for women) in the UCI World Ranking.

Mountain biking
Slovenia entered one mountain biker to compete in the women's cross-country race by finishing in the top two of the elite division vying for qualification at the 2019 UCI Mountain Bike World Championships in Mont-Sainte-Anne, Canada.

Golf

Slovenia entered one golfer into the Olympic tournament. Pia Babnik (world no. 301) qualified directly among the top 60 eligible players for the women's event based on the IGF World Rankings.

Gymnastics

Rhythmic
Slovenia entered one rhythmic gymnast into the Olympic competition for the first time, by receiving a spare berth freed up by host nation Japan, as the next highest-ranked athlete, not yet qualified, in the individual all-around at the 2019 World Championships in Baku, Azerbaijan.

Judo
 
Slovenia qualified five judoka (one man and four women) for each of the following weight classes at the Games. All of them, highlighted by Rio 2016 Olympians Adrian Gomboc (men's half-lightweight, 66 kg) and defending champion Tina Trstenjak (women's half-middleweight, 63 kg), were selected among the top 18 judoka of their respective weight classes based on the IJF World Ranking List of June 28, 2021.

Sailing

Slovenian sailors qualified one boat in each of the following classes through the 2018 Sailing World Championships, the class-associated Worlds, and the continental regattas.

M = Medal race; EL = Eliminated – did not advance into the medal race

Shooting

Slovenia granted an invitation from ISSF to send two-time Olympian Živa Dvoršak (women's 50 m rifle 3 positions) to the rescheduled Games as the highest-ranked shooter vying for qualification in the ISSF World Olympic Rankings of 6 June 2021.

Sport climbing

Slovenia entered two sport climbers into the Olympic tournament. Janja Garnbret qualified directly for the women's combined event, by winning the gold medal and securing one of the seven provisional berths at the 2019 IFSC World Championships in Hachioji, Japan. Meanwhile, Mia Krampl finished in the top six of those eligible for qualification at the IFSC World Qualifying Event in Toulouse, France, earning a quota place and joining with Gambret on the Slovenian roster.

Swimming 

Slovenian swimmers further achieved qualifying standards in the following events (up to a maximum of 2 swimmers in each event at the Olympic Qualifying Time (OQT), and potentially 1 at the Olympic Selection Time (OST)):

Table tennis

Slovenia entered three athletes into the table tennis competition at the Games. For the first time in history, the men's team secured a berth by advancing to the quarterfinal round of the 2020 World Olympic Qualification Event in Gondomar, Portugal, permitting a maximum of two starters to compete in the men's singles tournament.

Taekwondo

Slovenia entered one athlete into the taekwondo competition at the Games for the first time since London 2012. Ivan Trajkovič qualified directly for the men's heavyweight category (+80 kg) by finishing among the top five taekwondo practitioners at the end of the WT Olympic Rankings.

References

Nations at the 2020 Summer Olympics
2020
2021 in Slovenian sport